The 1978 USAC Championship Car season consisted of 18 races, beginning at Phoenix on March 18 and concluding at the same location on October 28.  The USAC National Champion was Tom Sneva and the Indianapolis 500 winner was Al Unser. This was the last year before the first USAC/CART "Split". By winning the Indianapolis 500, Pocono 500, and California 500, Al Unser swept the Indy car "Triple Crown", the only driver in history to do so.

The 1978 season is also statistically noteworthy. Danny Ongais won the most races (5), and Al Unser swept the triple crown races, but it was Tom Sneva (who did not win a single race) who won the championship title. Sneva had six 2nd place finishes, and twelve top 5s, and seven poles (including Indianapolis and Ontario), and experienced more consistent finishes. Sneva became the second driver to win the USAC championship without winning a race during the season, the last being Tony Bettenhausen in 1958. Sneva's "winless" championship was not without its critics, however, a statistician calculated points results using contemporary points tables from other major racing series, and concluded that Sneva would have still won the title in nearly every scenario.

The 1978 season was also a break-out year for future champion Rick Mears. Mario Andretti was running the full Formula One season (of which he would be World Champion). Andretti was running a partial Indy car schedule for Penske Racing, and Roger Penske hired the young Mears to fill in for Andretti the weekends he was overseas. Mears, who had spent two years in lesser-funded rides, jumped at the opportunity to drive for Penske, even though it was only a part-time ride. Mears won Co-Rookie of the Year at Indy, won three races, and despite running only 11 of 18 races, finished 9th in points.

Schedule and results

Final points standings

Note: Janet Guthrie is not eligible for points.

References

 
 
 
 
 http://media.indycar.com/pdf/2011/IICS_2011_Historical_Record_Book_INT6.pdf  (p. 214-216)

See also
 1978 Indianapolis 500

USAC Championship Car season
USAC Championship Car
1978 in American motorsport